Hayden Young (born 11 April 2001) is an Australian rules footballer who plays for the Fremantle Football Club in the Australian Football League (AFL).

Early career
Drafted with the 7th selection in the 2019 AFL draft from the Dandenong Stingrays in the NAB League, Young is the younger brother of the North Melbourne Kangaroos Lachie Young.  He was considered to be one of the best kicks in his draft class.

AFL career
Young made his AFL debut for Fremantle in the long-delayed second round of the 2020 AFL season at The Gabba against Brisbane, as a late replacement for Nathan Wilson. Young only played five games in 2020 due to an ankle injury sustained during Fremantle's clash against St Kilda. 

In 2021, he played the opening three games before a bad hamstring injury kept him out of the team for most of the year. He returned in round 19, before playing the best game of his career in Fremantle's upset win over Richmond in round 20 and received the Rising Star nomination. 

Young kicked his first goal during round eight of the 2022 AFL season in Fremantle's 78 point win over North Melbourne. Young signed a four-year contract extension in May tying him to Fremantle until at least the end of the 2027 season.

Statistics
 Statistics are correct to the end of 2022

|- style="background-color: #EAEAEA"
! scope="row" style="text-align:center" | 2020
|
| 26 || 5 || 0 || 0 || 33 || 17 || 50 || 16 || 7 || 0.0 || 0.0 || 6.6 || 3.4 || 10.0 || 3.2 || 1.4
|-
! scope="row" style="text-align:center" | 2021
|
| 26 || 8 || 0 || 0 || 85 || 42 || 127 || 45 || 19 || 0.0 || 0.0 || 10.6 || 5.3 || 15.9 || 5.6 || 2.4
|- style="background-color: #EAEAEA"
! scope="row" style="text-align:center" | 2022
|
| 26 || 22 || 1 || 1 || 306 || 196 || 502 || 164 || 50 || 0.1 || 0.0 || 12.6 || 8.4 || 21.0 || 6.5 || 2.3
|- class="sortbottom"
! colspan=3| Career
! 35
! 1
! 1
! 424
! 255
! 679
! 255
! 76
! 0.0
! 0.0
! 10.4
! 6.0
! 16.4
! 5.4
! 2.1
|}

Notes

References

External links

2001 births
Living people
Fremantle Football Club players
Australian rules footballers from Victoria (Australia)
Dandenong Stingrays players
Peel Thunder Football Club players